Gauripur Assembly constituency is one of the 126 constituencies of the Assam Legislative Assembly. Gauripur forms a part of the Dhubri Lok Sabha constituency.

Members of Legislative Assembly 
 1957: Prakritish Chandra Barua, Independent
 1962: Syed Ahmed Ali, Indian National Congress
 1967: Mohammad Azad Ali, Praja Socialist Party
 1972: Syed Ahmed Ali, Indian National Congress
 1978: Mohammad Azad Ali, Janata Party
 1983: Joynal Abedin, Indian National Congress
 1985: Aniruddha Singha Chowdhury, Independent
 1991: Mohibul Haque, Indian National Congress
 1996: Banendra Mushahary, Independent
 2001: Banendra Mushahary, Asom Gana Parishad
 2006: Mohibul Haque, Independent
 2011: Banendra Mushahary, Bodoland People's Front
 2016: Nijanur Rahman, All India United Democratic Front
 2021: Nijanur Rahman, All India United Democratic Front

Election result

2016 result

2011 result

References

External links 
 

Assembly constituencies of Assam